Oliver Herford (2 December 1860 – 5 July 1935) was an Anglo-American writer, artist, and illustrator known for his pithy bon mots and skewed sense of humor.

He was born in Sheffield, England on 2 December 1860 to Rev. Brooke Herford and Hannah Hankinson Herford. Oliver's father, a Unitarian minister, moved the family to Chicago in 1876 and to Boston in 1882. Oliver attended Antioch College in Yellow Springs, Ohio, from 1877 to 1879. Later he studied art at the Slade School in London and the Académie Julien in Paris. Afterward, he moved to New York, where he lived until his death.

"Herford, regarded as the American Oscar Wilde, was known for his wit".  His sister Beatrice Herford was also a humorist, delivering comic monologues on stage.

To appeal to Christmas shoppers in 1902, Ethel Mumford and Addison Mizner published a small book, printed in San Francisco, The Cynic's Calendar of Revised Wisdom for 1903, featuring a barbed epigram or aphorism for each week of the year; they added Herford's name as an author, either as a spoof or to take advantage of his burgeoning notoriety, and to everyone's surprise the calendar was an astounding success. When Herford got wind of the story, he demanded 90% of the royalties. He was awarded an equal third, and annual incarnations of the Cynic's Calendar, including contributions from Herford, continued to appear for the rest of the decade and beyond.

Herford's cartoons and humorous verses regularly enlivened publications including as Life, Woman's Home Companion, Ladies' Home Journal, Century Magazine, Harper's Weekly, The Masses, The Mentor, and Punch. From the 1890s to the 1930s, Herford authored over 30 books, sometimes written in collaboration with others (notably John Cecil Clay), and usually illustrated by himself. He also illustrated many books by other authors, including Joel Chandler Harris, Carolyn Wells, and Edgar Lee Masters. His 1894 collaboration with Gertrude Hall, Allegretto, was dedicated "To Wolcott Balestier, These Verses anjd Pictures." Balestier had died in 1891 at the age of 29.
 
Herford was a longtime member of the Players Club in New York City, where his wit became "one of the traditions of Gramercy Park." He married Margaret Regan, an Englishwoman, in New York on May 26, 1905. They made their home at 182 East 18th Street for about thirty years. Herford died on July 5, 1935, and his wife died the following December.

From his obituary in The New York Times:"His wit…was too original at first to go down with the very delectable highly respectable magazine editors of the Nineties. It was odd, unexpected, his own brand. It takes genius to write the best nonsense, which is often far more sensible than sense. Herford's, the result of care and polish, looked unforced.…Intelligent, thoughtful, well-bred, what with his animals and his children and his artistic simplicities, he was remote from the style of the best moderns. No violence, no obscenity, not even obscurity or that long-windedness which is the signet of the illustrious writer of today. An old-fashioned gentleman, a painstaking artist, whose work had edge, grace and distinction."

Books 

Other books by Oliver Herford (without his illustrations):
The Smoker's Yearbook, the verses written on paper by Oliver Herford & the pictures drawn on stone by Sewell Collins (1908).
The Devil, by Ferenc Molnar, a play, adapted by Oliver Herford (1908).
The Bishop's Purse, a novel by Oliver Herford and Cleveland Moffett (1913).
What'll You Have? a play, by Oliver Herford and Karl Schmidt (1925).

Books by other authors, illustrated by Oliver Herford:

Books with introductions by Oliver Herford:
Poems from "Life", orchestration by [i.e., edited by] Charles B. Faliswith, introductory words by Oliver Herford (1923).
A Jongleur Strayed, Verses on Love and Other Matters Sacred and Profane by Richard Le Gallienne, introduction by Oliver Herford (1922).
Skippy, from Life by Percy L. Crosby, an introduction by Oliver Herford (1924).

Miscellany
The Literary Guillotine by Charles Battell Loomis (1903); Oliver Herford appears as a character (himself) in the text.

References

External links

 
Biography and selected works, Americanartarchives.com
Archive of poems
Collected quotations
 
 
 
The Ohio State University Billy Ireland Cartoon Library & Museum: Oliver Herford Collection Guide
  (perhaps more than 300 "photo, print, or drawing")

19th-century American poets
American male poets
American humorists
American illustrators
1860 births
1935 deaths
19th-century American male writers
Writers from Sheffield
Antioch College alumni
Alumni of the Slade School of Fine Art
Académie Julian
Addison Mizner
Members of the American Academy of Arts and Letters